Primus was a Polish professional cycling team, which competed in elite road bicycle racing events such as the UCI Women's Road World Cup.

Major wins
2008
Klasyczny-Nałęczów, Katarzyna Bodanka

National champions
2008
 Poland Time Trial, Bogumiła Matusiak

References

Cycling teams based in Poland
UCI Women's Teams
Cycling teams established in 2008